Matic Osovnikar (born January 19, 1980 in Kranj) is a former Slovenian athlete specializing in the 100 metres. Osovnikar competed in the 2004 Summer Olympics where he achieved third place in his 100 metres heat, thus making through to the second round but narrowly missed out on a placing in the semi-finals after achieving fourth place in his second round heat.

He was the bronze medalist in the 100 m at the 2006 European Athletics Championships, setting a new national record (10.14 s).

He finished 7th in the 100 m final at the 2007 World Championships in Osaka with a time of 10.23 s.

At the 2008 Summer Olympics, Osovnikar competed at the 100 metres and placed 3rd in his heat after Samuel Francis and Marc Burns in a time of 10.46 seconds. He qualified for the second round in which he improved his time to 10.24 seconds. However, he was unable to qualify for the semi finals as he finished in 6th place of his heat. He also took part in the 200 metres finishing fourth with a time of 20.89 seconds in his first round heat. With 20.95 seconds in the second round he only placed eighth in his heat, which was not enough for the semi finals.

Personal bests
100m : 10.13(Osaka 2007)
200m : 20.47(Athens 2004)

Competition record

References

External links

maticosonvikar.com

1980 births
Living people
Slovenian male sprinters
Athletes (track and field) at the 2000 Summer Olympics
Athletes (track and field) at the 2004 Summer Olympics
Athletes (track and field) at the 2008 Summer Olympics
Olympic athletes of Slovenia
Sportspeople from Kranj
European Athletics Championships medalists
Mediterranean Games gold medalists for Slovenia
Mediterranean Games bronze medalists for Slovenia
Athletes (track and field) at the 2005 Mediterranean Games
Mediterranean Games medalists in athletics